Diapheromera persimilis, the similar walkingstick, is a species of walkingstick in the family Diapheromeridae. It is found in North America.

References

Phasmatodea
Articles created by Qbugbot
Insects described in 1904